Helge Karlsen (born 29 June 1948) is a former Norwegian football player, who played for SK Brann in the Norwegian Premier League from 1967 to 1979. He played 237 games totally for Brann, and 180 of them was in the league. In 1972 and 1976 he won the Norwegian Football Cup with Brann. He was immortalized in the famous SK Brann song "Vi è de beste" by Ove Thue in which he has his own verse.

Helge Karlsen played 35 games for Norway's national football team.

References

1948 births
Living people
Norwegian footballers
Norway international footballers
SK Brann players
Footballers from Bergen
Eliteserien players
Association football defenders